João Klauss de Mello (born 1 March 1997), commonly known as Klauss, is a Brazilian professional footballer who plays as a striker for Major League Soccer club St. Louis City SC.

Early life
João Klauss de Mello was born in Criciúma, Santa Catarina. He began his career with Internacional in Porto Alegre, joining the club at the age of 9. Klauss moved with his mother to Porte Alegre after his parents separated. Both parents supported his football career from early on. At the age of 13, he was released from Internacional's youth program and moved to Juventude in Caxias do Sul. After a year he moved back to Porto Alegre and joined the Grêmio's youth academy.

Club career

Klauss signed for his first European club in January 2017 when he moved to Hoffenheim in Germany. He initially struggled with the cultural change. He played 17 matches and scored 4 goals for Hoffenheim II in the Regionalliga Südwest. He was loaned to HJK in March 2018. On 8 April, he scored in his debut in the Veikkausliiga against Ilves.

On 8 January 2019, Klauss was loaned out to LASK until 30 June 2020.
On 31 January 2022, Klauss joined Sint-Truiden on loan.

Klauss joined Major League Soccer side St. Louis City SC in July 2022, following the conclusion of his loan at Sint-Truiden. He was the club's first ever designated player.
On February 25, 2023, the opening match of the MLS season, Klauss scored the final goal in a 2–3 victory over Austin FC, which marked the first win in St. Louis' franchise history.

Personal life
Born in Brazil, Klauss is of German descent through his father, and Italian descent through his mother. He holds an Italian passport.

Career statistics

Club

Honours
HSK
Veikkausliiga: 2018

Individual
Veikkausliiga Player of the Year: 2018
Veikkausliiga Top scorer: 2018
Veikkausliiga Striker of the Year: 2018
Veikkausliiga Breakthrough the Year: 2018
Veikkausliiga Team of the Year: 2018

References

External links
HJK profile

1997 births
Living people
People from Criciúma
Association football forwards
Brazilian footballers
Brazilian people of German descent
Brazilian people of Italian descent
TSG 1899 Hoffenheim II players
Helsingin Jalkapalloklubi players
LASK players
TSG 1899 Hoffenheim players
Standard Liège players
Sint-Truidense V.V. players
Regionalliga players
Veikkausliiga players
Austrian Football Bundesliga players
Bundesliga players
Belgian Pro League players
Brazilian expatriate footballers
Expatriate footballers in Germany
Brazilian expatriate sportspeople in Germany
Expatriate footballers in Finland
Brazilian expatriate sportspeople in Finland
Expatriate footballers in Austria
Brazilian expatriate sportspeople in Austria
Expatriate footballers in Belgium
Brazilian expatriate sportspeople in Belgium
Expatriate soccer players in the United States
Brazilian expatriate sportspeople in the United States
Designated Players (MLS)
Sportspeople from Santa Catarina (state)
MLS Next Pro players